Lago di Ledro is a lake in Trentino, northern Italy.

In 2009 and 2011 the lake suffered from algal blooms, caused by Planktothrix.

History 

Lake Ledro originates from the deposition of a morainal bank during the fourth glacial era. Since 1929, the lake level has been regulated to suit the energy requirements of the hydroelectric power station of Riva del Garda, which uses the water of the lake to produce electricity on a pumped-storage basis.

The Lake's water sources are mainly underneath the lake. There are also tributaries (Massangla (at the West end of the lake, joined by the Torrente Assat of Pieve), Assat of Pur (from the South, at the East end of the lake), and Rio di Val Molini (at the Northern corner at the West end of the lake)), although these are dry for most of the year.

At Lake Ledro is the site of an archaeological area with an associated museum and botanical garden situated on the River Ponale flowing out of the lake to the east. The area was discovered in the 1920s when the level of the lake was lowered to supply the hydroelectric plant being built at Riva del Garda. This archaeological site is one of the most important in Europe for evidencing the extent and wealth of the manufactures of its time.

References 

 Lago di Ledro Environment

External links

Lakes of Trentino-Alto Adige/Südtirol
Garda Mountains